Calystegia purpurata is a species of morning glory known by the common name Pacific false bindweed.

It is endemic to California, where it grows in the seaside scrub of the coastline and the chaparral of the coastal and inland valleys.

Description
Calystegia purpurata is a robust perennial herb growing from a woody caudex and extending spreading or climbing stems up to 70 centimeters. The lobed leaves are up to 5 centimeters long and generally triangular in shape.

The inflorescence produces 1 to 5 flowers atop peduncles. The flower is a morning glory up to 5 centimeters wide, in color white, pink, purple, or white or cream with purple stripes.

References

External links
 Calflora Database: Calystegia purpurata (Pacific false bindweed, Smooth western morning glory)
Jepson Manual eFlora (TJM2) treatment of Calystegia purpurata 
UC Photos gallery: Calystegia purpurata

purpurata
Endemic flora of California
Natural history of the California chaparral and woodlands
Natural history of the California Coast Ranges
Natural history of the San Francisco Bay Area
Natural history of the Santa Monica Mountains
Natural history of the Transverse Ranges
Flora without expected TNC conservation status